Imran Nadeem  is a Pakistani politician who was member of the 2nd Gilgit Baltistan Assembly.

References

Living people
Gilgit-Baltistan MLAs 2015–2020
Year of birth missing (living people)